Amir Velić (born 28 March 1999) is a Bosnian professional footballer who plays as a centre-back for First League of FBiH club Igman Konjic.

Club career

Early career
Velić started off his career at the youth team of Željezničar, after which he was called up to the first team in 2017.

He stayed at the first team of Željezničar for one year, until 2018. During that time, he made one appearance for the club, in a 0–2 away win against Radnik Bijeljina on 10 September 2017.

He won the Bosnian Cup with Željezničar in the 2017–18 season. He left the club in June 2018.

In July 2018, alongside teammate Almir Ćubara, Velić signed with First League of FBiH club Bosna Visoko. He made his debut for Bosna Visoko on 11 August 2018, in a 1–0 away loss against Jedinstvo Bihać. In the 2018–19 First League of FBiH season, with Bosna, Velić got relegated to the Second League of FBiH (Group Center).

In July 2019, Velić signed a contract with Orašje. His first appearance for Orašje was on 10 August 2019, in a 1–0 home league win against Rudar Kakanj. Velić then joined Goražde in January 2020.

International career
Velić played for the Bosnia and Herzegovina U17 and the Bosnia and Herzegovina U19 national teams, making 9 and 5 caps respectively for both teams, but did not score a goal for neither.

Career statistics

Club

Honours
Željezničar
Bosnian Cup: 2017–18

References

External links
Amir Velić at Sofascore
Amir Velić profile at Soccerpunter

1999 births
Living people
Footballers from Sarajevo
Bosnia and Herzegovina footballers
Premier League of Bosnia and Herzegovina players
First League of the Federation of Bosnia and Herzegovina players
FK Željezničar Sarajevo players
NK Bosna Visoko players
HNK Orašje players
FK Goražde players
Bosnia and Herzegovina youth international footballers
Association football central defenders